Kilbourne High School may refer to:

Kilbourne High School (Louisiana) - Kilbourne, Louisiana
Worthington Kilbourne High School - Columbus, Ohio